Storm oil is oil used to calm an area of water. It has been claimed that it has been used to calm seas to facilitate rescues. Oil was usually carried in a bag which would be released onto the water or in a container which would slowly deploy the oil.

Description
Steamships and lifeboats from many countries were required to carry them until the end of the 20th century. The United States Maritime Service Training Manual included storm oil in the list of general equipment aboard lifeboats, while the Merchant Shipping Act 1894 mandated them for British vessels until 1998. Frequently vegetable oil or fish oil was used as a cheap form of oil.

Oil has a damping effect on water which absorbs some of the energy of the waves. It also quickly forms a thin layer over a large expanse of the surface of the water through a process of deprotonation. This prevents wind from being able to get traction along the water and thus waves cannot form as easily.

History
The practice can be traced back as far as 350 BC with Aristotle and to the early 1st century with Pliny the Elder. Aristotle described the use of oil being spread on the eyes of divers with the intention to "quiet the surface and permit the rays of light to reach them". Whaling vessels are purported to have dangled blubber around the hull when in heavy seas to help calm the ocean. Benjamin Franklin famously investigated the calming properties of oil during his visits to England in the mid-18th century, demonstrating the effect on lakes such as Derwentwater. Communications between Franklin and William Brownrigg show that Franklin had first encountered the phenomenon aboard a ship in 1757 and investigated it several years later alongside Brownrigg and Sir John Pringle. This led to the discussion of the topic at the Royal Society on 2 June 1774.

References

History of navigation
Maritime history
Oils